Santokh Singh Chaudhary (18 June 1946 – 14 January 2023) was an Indian politician who was a Cabinet Minister of Punjab and a member of parliament from Jalandhar (Lok Sabha constituency). He won the 2014 Indian general election and 2019 Indian general election being an Indian National Congress candidate. 

Chaudhary was born on 18 June 1946. He died on 14 January 2023, at the age of 76, after suffering a heart attack during Bharat Jodo Yatra in Phillaur. He was cremated in his native village in Jalandhar, Punjab.

References

|-

1946 births
2023 deaths
India MPs 2014–2019
Lok Sabha members from Punjab, India
People from Jalandhar district
Indian National Congress politicians
India MPs 2019–present